Hindus form 79.83% of the state's total population as per 2011 census. Hindus form the majority in all the districts of the  state.The religion plays an important role in the lives of the Maharashtrian people in their day-to-day life.Vitthal, other incarnations of Vishnu such as Ramchandra and Krishna, Maruti, Dattatreya, and Shiva Family deities such as Shankar, Parvati, and Ganesh, are  popular with Hindus of Maharashtra. The varkari tradition holds a strong grip on the local Hindus of Maharashtra. The public Ganesh festival started by Lokmanya Tilak in the late 19th century is very popular. Marathi Hindus also revere Bhakti saints associated with varkari sects such as Dnyaneshwar, Savata Mali, Tukaram, Namdev, Janabaii and Chokhamela. Many religious figures from 19th and 20th century are revered. They include Swami Samarth, Gajanan Maharaj, Sai baba of Shirdi, Tukdoji Maharaj, Gondavalekar Maharaj, and Gadge Maharaj.

In every village of Maharashtra, at least one Hindu temple can be found. Maharashtra also has significant Hindu populations with origins in other states and regions of India, which adds to the diversity of temples and traditions in the state. The state has numerous recently built temples by groups such as the Swaminarayan sect, ISKCON, and South Indian communities.

Tradition
Varakari is a major tradition followed by Marathi Hindus. Varakaris are Vaishnav devotees. Vththal is a deity worshipped mostly in Varakari tradition. 
The main Deity worshipped in Maharashtra is  Krishna in the form of Viththal.

Deities

Maharashtrian Hindus worship many deities that are considered incarnations or manifestations of Vishnu.They also worship Shiv, Parvati, and Ganesh.
 Viththal/Vithoba or Pandurangâ a form of Krishna.
 Krishna or Shrikrushna.
 Parashuram.
Ram
Maruti.
Mahadev (Shiva)
Malhar or Khandoba, an avatar of Shiva.
 Ganapati.
 Dattatreya as Datta or Datt and his avatars

Demographics
The following data is taken from 2001 Census of India.

Hindus by district in Maharashtra

Hindus are in majority in all districts and subdistricts of Maharashtra.
The data taken from 2001 census of India. 
Almost all districts in Maharashtra are Hindu majority

Gallery

References